The Ampulicidae, or cockroach wasps, are a small (about 170 species), primarily tropical family of sphecoid wasps, all of which use various cockroaches as prey for their larvae. They tend to have elongated jaws, pronounced neck-like constrictions behind the head, strongly petiolate abdomens, and deep grooves on the thorax. Many are quite ant-like in appearance, though some are brilliant metallic blue, green, and hot pink.

Most species sting the roach more than once and in a specific way. The first sting is directed at nerve ganglia in the cockroach's thorax, temporarily paralyzing the victim for a few minutes - more than enough time for the wasp to deliver a second sting. The second sting is directed into a region of the cockroach's brain that controls the escape reflex, among other things.  When the cockroach has recovered from the first sting, it makes no attempt to flee. The wasp clips the antenna with its mandibles and drinks some of the haemolymph before walking backwards and dragging the roach by its clipped antenna to steer it to a burrow, where an egg will be laid on it. The wasp larva feeds on the subdued, living cockroach.

Classification
Classification of Ampulicidae follows the Catalog of Sphecidae by Wojciech J. Pulawski, California Academy of Sciences:

Ampulicinae
Ampulicini
Ampulex – 132 species, found worldwide
Trirogma – 7 species from Asia

Dolichurinae
Aphelotomini
Aphelotoma – 8 species from Australia
Riekefella – 1 species from Australia
Dolichurini
Dolichurus – 50 species, found worldwide
Paradolichurus – 4 species from the New World

References

 
Apocrita families
Insects used as insect pest control agents
Biological pest control wasps
Taxa named by William Edward Shuckard